Events from the year 1982 in Iran.

Incumbents
 Supreme Leader: Ruhollah Khomeini 
 President: Ali Khamenei
 Prime Minister: Mir-Hossein Mousavi
 Chief Justice: Abdul-Karim Mousavi Ardebili

Events
 Iranian diplomats kidnapping – Three Iranian diplomats and one Iranian photographer disappeared in Lebanon during the invasion of Lebanon.

See also
 Years in Iraq
 Years in Afghanistan

References

 
Years of the 20th century in Iran
1980s in Iran